Devil's Half Acre, Devil's Half-Acre or Devil's half acre may refer to:

Places 

The Devil's Half-Acre, Pennsylvania, a parcel of land and popular tourist location in Buck's County
"Devil's half acre", an area of slave trading and slave jails in the 1800s, including Lumpkin's jail, Richmond, Virginia

See also 
Devil's Acre, a notorious slum near Westminster Abbey in Victorian London, England
Hell's Half Acre (disambiguation)